Heartsounds is an American drama television film directed by Glenn Jordan and written by Fay Kanin, based on the book Heartsounds: The Story of a Love and Loss by Martha Weinman Lear. It stars Mary Tyler Moore and James Garner, with Sam Wanamaker, Wendy Crewson, David Gardner, and Carl Marotte in supporting roles. Produced by Embassy Television, the film premiered on ABC on September 30, 1984, as part of the anthology series ABC Theater.

Heartsounds received three Primetime Emmy Award nominations: Outstanding Drama/Comedy Special, Outstanding Lead Actor for Garner, and Outstanding Lead Actress for Moore. The film was honored with the Peabody Award to ABC Theater, while Garner was also nominated for a Golden Globe Award for his performance.

Plot
New York urologist Harold Lear gets a taste of his own medicine when he suffers a heart attack and is confronted with a medical institution which does not seem equipped to help. Wife Martha steps in to fight the system and get a measure of service and compassion. Ultimately the greatest battle is not waged against the medical profession, however, but against Lear's own failing body and his own mortal fears.

Cast
 Mary Tyler Moore as Martha Weinman Lear 
 James Garner as Harold Lear
 Sam Wanamaker as Moe Silverman
 Wendy Crewson as Judy
 David Gardner as Barney Knapp
 Carl Marotte as Michael 
 Wayne Best as Intern, Lover
 Anthony Bishop as Proprietor
 David Bolt as Psychoanalyst
 David Clement as Dr. Bell
 Beverly Cooper as Nurse Lark
 Eve Crawford as Ruth Nathanson 
 Sandy Crawley as Chief Resident 
 Marvin Goldhar as Mr. Weinman
 Lynne Gorman as Mrs. Bailey
 Patricia Hamilton as Flo
 Tom Harvey as Walter Simon 
 Meg Hogarth as Estelle 
 Cec Linder as Dr. Lorber
 Doris Petrie as Mrs. Weinman
 Steve Petrie as Chet
 Maida Rogerson as Annie
 Michael J. Reynolds as Dr. Roberts 
 Françoise Vallée as The Neurologist
 Paul Vincent as Fred, The Doorman
 Jimmy Williams as Carl (as Jim Williams)
 George E. Zeeman as Dr. Gross (as George Zeeman)

Reception

Critical response
The New York Times television critic John J. O'Connor wrote that "the film packs something of the wallop of a powerful and unblinking documentary" and lauded the performances of Moore and Garner. According to The Washington Post, author Martha Weinman Lear said: "I'm thrilled by the casting" and "I'm extremely lucky to have landed in the care of all these people… The screenplay is incredibly faithful to the spirit and substance of the book." The Peabody Awards noted that "both Moore and Garner turn in captivating performances and take full advantage of a lean and emotionally powerful script."

Accolades

References

External links
 
 

1984 films
1984 drama films
1984 television films
1980s American films
1980s English-language films
ABC network original films
American drama television films
Films about diseases
Films about marriage
Films about physicians
Films based on non-fiction books
Films directed by Glenn Jordan
Films scored by Leonard Rosenman
Films set in New York City
Films shot in New York City
Films shot in Toronto
Peabody Award-winning broadcasts
Television films based on books